Mary Davidson may refer to:
 Mary Davidson (Irish politician) (1902–1986), member of Seanad Éireann
 Mary Davidson (artist) (1865–1951), Scottish artist
 Mary Davidson (editor) (1872–1941), American newspaper editor and member of the Illinois House of Representatives
 Mary Ann Davidson, chief security officer of Oracle Corporation
 Mary Ann Maitland (1839–1919), née Davidson, Scottish-born Canadian author

See also
 MaryJanice Davidson, American author